Pikeliškės is a village in Vilnius District Municipality, in Riešė Eldership. It is located 8 kilometers south of Paberžė. The village houses a lower secondary school and a library.

A former 18th-century manor farmstead that once was a summer residence of Józef Piłsudski can be found near Lake Žalesas.

Geography 
Lake Žalesas and Pikeliškės Forest are located near the village.

References 

Vilnius District Municipality